St. Paul's College is a private Catholic primary and secondary school, located in Windhoek, the capital of Namibia.

History and operations
The school was established in 1962 as a Catholic white boys' school. The Roman Catholic Church purchased a farm situated at the foot of Roman Hill in Klein Windhoek, a low-density suburb. Due to the presence of hot springs and fountains at the time, it was possible to develop a vineyard, gardens and orchards where the school is currently located.

When Namibia became independent from South Africa in 1990, the school became multicultural and was opened to girls from grades 1 to 12.

In 2014, St. Paul's College was Namibia's second-best high school, behind St Boniface College, located in the Kavango East Region.

Notable alumni
 Tony Figueira, photographer
 Zenobia Kloppers, actress

See also

 Education in Namibia
 List of schools in Namibia
 Roman Catholicism in Namibia

References

External links
 , the school's official website

1962 establishments in South West Africa

Educational institutions established in 1962
Catholic elementary and primary schools in Namibia
Catholic secondary schools in Namibia
Schools in Windhoek